Filippo Fasio Capponi (died October 1570) was a Roman Catholic prelate who served as Bishop of Lettere-Gragnano (1570).

Biography
On 9 June 1570, Filippo Fasio Capponi was appointed during the papacy of Pope Pius V as Bishop of Lettere-Gragnano. 
He served as Bishop of Lettere-Gragnano until his death in October 1570.

See also
Catholic Church in Italy

References

External links 
 (for Chronology of Bishops) 
 (for Chronology of Bishops)  

16th-century Italian Roman Catholic bishops
Bishops appointed by Pope Pius V
1570 deaths